The dusky turtle dove (Streptopelia lugens) is a species of bird in the family Columbidae.
It is found in Burundi, Democratic Republic of the Congo, Eritrea, Ethiopia, Kenya, Malawi, Rwanda, Saudi Arabia, Somalia, South Sudan, Tanzania, Uganda, Yemen, and Zambia.

References

Streptopelia
Birds of East Africa
Birds of the Middle East
Birds described in 1837
Taxonomy articles created by Polbot